Banny is a rural locality (a khutor) in Lychakskoye Rural Settlement, Frolovsky District, Volgograd Oblast, Russia. The population was 68 as of 2010.

Geography 
Banny is located in center of Frolovsky District, 23 km northeast of Prigorodny (the district's administrative centre) by road. Blagodatny is the nearest rural locality.

References 

Rural localities in Frolovsky District